Stanley Smith (born 20 August 1952) is a Barbadian former cyclist. He competed in the sprint event at the 1976 Summer Olympics.

References

External links
 

1952 births
Living people
Barbadian male cyclists
Olympic cyclists of Barbados
Cyclists at the 1976 Summer Olympics
Place of birth missing (living people)